The B-611 is a Chinese solid-fuelled short-range ballistic missile (SRBM) developed by China Precision Machinery Import-Export Corporation (CPMIEC). The missile has a maximum range of 150–400 km.

The B-611 development began development in 1995, and first shown in 2004. A newer variant was shown in late 2006.

The B-611 was sold to Turkey via technology transfer. Further developed into J-600T Yıldırım and Bora (missile).

Variants

B611
Basic variant, with a range of 250–280 km and a 500 kg warhead.

B611M
Upgraded variant of the B-611, with a 480 kg warhead and a range between 80–260 km.

B611MR
The B611MR is a semi-ballistic surface-launched anti-radar missile first advertised in 2014. It uses GPS-inertial guidance and wideband passive radar. The missile is capable of flying flattened trajectory and performing pre-programmed maneuvers to reduce the chance of interception.

P-12
The P-12 is a variant of the B-611. The P-12 has a longer strake, and is believed to be lighter than the B-611 and carry a 300 kg HE fragmentation or blast warhead.

A pair of the missiles may be carried inside a  6 x 6 wheeled vehicle.

The P-12 was first shown at the 2006 China International Aviation & Aerospace Exhibition.

BP-12
The BP-12 is a variant that has satellite guidance, and is considered the first member of the family to branch out from the B-611.

BP-12A
The BP-12A is similar to the Type 631, with an estimated range of 300–400 km and a 480 kg warhead. The missile can be integrated into the SY-400 missile launcher.

CM-401
CM-401 is a hypersonic anti-ship ballistic missile developed by CASIC, with a range of up to 290 km and terminal active radar homing guidance.

BP-12B
Latest variant, exhibited at the 2016 Zhuhai Airshow. It uses radar or infrared guidance and can hit slow moving targets like ships (anti-ship ballistic missile).

SY-300
SY-300 is a development of WS-2/3, with SY standing for Shen Ying (神鹰 meaning Divine Eagle), designed after the 4th Academy and the 9th Academy of China Aerospace Science and Technology Corporation (CASC) were merged to form a new 4th Academy.  The main difference between the SY300 and its WS-2/3 predecessor is that for WS-2/3, the control section of the forward control surfaces and the warhead are integrated into a single unit, but they are separated in SY-300.  This design difference enables the guidance system of SY300 to be rapidly changed in the field by soldiers, by simply replacing the guidance system with a dummy weight, when SY-300 needs to be used as an unguided rocket. Each vehicle can carry either six or twelve SY300 rockets.

SY-400
SY-400 is a further development of SY-300, that can carry either two short-range ballistic missiles BP-12A with range of 400 km or eight 400mm rockets. As a low cost alternative to more expensive ballistic missiles, the accuracy of SY400 is increased by adding GPS to correct the cascade inertial navigational guidance, and according to the developer, the accuracy can be further improved if military grade GPS signals are used to replacing the existing civilian GPS signal.  Another feature of SY-400 is that it shares the same launching vehicle and fire control system of BP-12A ballistic missile, thus simplifying logistics.

Operators

Current operators

 : BP-12A(SY-400)
 : BP-12A

See also
 DF-12
 Weishi Rockets
 J-600T Yıldırım

References

Ballistic missiles of the People's Republic of China
Weapons of the People's Republic of China
Guided missiles of Turkey
Theatre ballistic missiles
Military equipment introduced in the 2000s